The Coachman, also known as The Little Man (L'Omino), is a fictional character and the main antagonist who appears in Carlo Collodi's 1883 book The Adventures of Pinocchio (Le avventure di Pinocchio).

In the novel

The Coachman is introduced in chapter XXXI, and is described as thus:Picture for yourselves a little man, broader than he is tall, tender and greasy like a ball of butter, with a rosy face, a small, constantly laughing mouth and a thin, adorable voice of a cat wishing all the best to its master.

The Coachman's name is never revealed, though he identifies himself in Chapter XXXI as merely "The Little Man" (L’Omino). He drives to the Island of Busy Bees (Isola delle Api Industriose) on a coach pulled by twenty-four donkeys which mysteriously wear white shoes on their hooves. By the time he arrives to take Pinocchio and Candlewick (Lucignolo) to the Land of Toys (Il Paese dei Balocchi), his carriage is completely packed, leaving Candlewick to sit in front with him and Pinocchio to ride one of the donkeys.

The donkey throws Pinocchio off and is reproached by the Coachman, who comes to it and acts as if he's going to give it a kiss, but then bites half its right ear off. When Pinocchio tries again and the donkey bucks him off a second time, the Coachman again reproaches the animal by biting off half its other ear. When Pinocchio successfully mounts the donkey, it begins to weep like a human and warns Pinocchio of the impending danger he faces. When Pinocchio notes that the donkey is weeping, the Coachman tells him to let it weep.

The Coachman proceeds to kidnap the delinquent children and take them to the Land of Toys. As the children sleep on the way to the Land of Toys, the Coachman sings to himself "All night they sleep, and I never sleep..." Upon arriving at the land, the lazy children do not work or study and spend their days playing for five months. One day, Pinocchio and Candlewick awake with donkeys' ears.

In Chapter XXXIII, the Coachman visits Pinocchio and Candlewick when they have become full donkeys due to their idleness. He violently breaks into their house, meticulously waxes their fur, and puts them on sale. Candlewick is bought by a farmer whose donkey has died while Pinocchio is bought by a circus ringmaster. He has become a millionaire by selling children for the donkey trade.

Disney version

The Coachman appears in the 1940 film adaptation of the book by Walt Disney Animation Studios. His voice is provided by Charles Judels, who also provides the voice of Stromboli in the film.

As opposed to the original character, he is large and physically imposing, and speaks with a harsh Cockney accent, though he does not bite his donkeys' ears. The Coachman is assisted by his henchmen, numerous silent black figures with ape-like arms, who lock Pleasure Island's doors for him and handle the crates used to transport donkeys with.

He meets Honest John and Gideon in the Red Lobster Inn and hires them to round up naughty boys for him, promising to pay them apparently a lot of money, but specifically warning them not to double-cross him. He intimidates them with a sudden massively frightening face and grin, presenting himself as a sort of demonic figure as well as an antithesis to the Blue Fairy.

The Coachman takes the boys to Pleasure Island on a stagecoach that was full of donkeys to aboard a steamboat, where he encourages them to act like "jackasses" and misbehave. Once the boys are engaging in the activities, the Coachman orders his henchmen to lock the doors tight and to get below and get the crates ready. When the boys are turned into donkeys and his henchmen load the fully transformed donkeys onto the steamboat as Jiminy Cricket discovers, the Coachman sorts the donkeys who can talk from those who cannot talk by asking for their names, the latter being stripped of their clothes and sold to places like the salt mines and the circuses. Donkeys, who can still talk, are taken back and put in a fenced area either until the transformation finishes and to ensure they don't alert the authorities, where they now begin to protest by begging to be let out and pleading for mercy, as Alexander can even talk and wants to go home to his mother other than being a donkey. Irritated and annoyed by them wanting him to give them another chance, the Coachman comes forward toward the donkeys and cracks his whip and quotes "Quiet! You boys have had your fun. Now pay for it." With Jiminy Cricket's help, Pinocchio and Jiminy Cricket escape from Pleasure Island before the Coachman and his henchmen can see them. Like Stromboli, his ultimate fate is never revealed in the film, though he presumably claims Lampwick after he becomes a donkey and made a fortune after selling all the donkeys.

He appears as a boss in the film's video game adaptation, where he fights Pinocchio on a cliff and attacks using a donkey as well as his own whip. At the end of the boss battle, Pinocchio knocks him over the cliff.

In the Descendants novel The Isle of the Lost, the Coachman is among the villains imprisoned on the Isle of the Lost. Here, he operates a taxi cab that is pulled by normal donkeys. It is mentioned that prior to being imprisoned, the Coachman had to spend a year rounding up all the boys that were turned into donkeys.

Luke Evans portrays the Coachman in a live-action adaptation of the Disney animated film. Unlike the original film, Pinocchio is not given to the Coachman by Honest John and Gideon and Pinocchio is just invited onto his stagecoach during his drive after escaping from Stromboli’s puppet show. The Coachman interacts with Pinocchio during the ride to Pleasure Island and states that he won't be a puppet anymore by the time he visits Pleasure Island while also causing Pinocchio to give up his doubts. His henchmen all appear to be vapor monsters when it comes to him getting the children turned into donkeys ready to be sold to their respective destinations like the salt mines. When Lampwick is turned into a donkey, the Coachman and two vapor monsters start to come in only for Lampwick's donkey form to kick a table into them. This causes Pinocchio and Jiminy Cricket to flee as two vapor monsters transform into a mode of transportation for the Coachman to chase Pinocchio. After Pinocchio and Jiminy escape into the ocean, the Coachman rambles that "a wooden donkey would've be worth the bloody fortune".

Other appearances

 In Giuliano Cenci's 1972 animated film The Adventures of Pinocchio, the Coachman, voiced by Gianni Bonagura, is portrayed much more closely to the book than his Disney counterpart. He works alone and is portrayed as an effeminate and alluring character with a high-pitched voice, who easily tricks Pinocchio and Candlewick into coming to the Land of Toys. However, he is not portrayed as violently as in the book.
 In Pinocchio's Christmas, a sleigh driver (voiced by Bob McFadden) working for a rich duke is based on the Coachman. 
 In The Adventures of Pinocchio, the character's role is fused with that of Mangiafuoco and The Terrible Dogfish into the villainous Lorenzini (portrayed by Udo Kier). Pinocchio accidentally sets the villain Lorenzini's theater on fire, causing Lorenzini to change career and begin luring unruly children to Terra Magica where the children inevitably drink cursed water, turning them into donkeys. During a struggle with Pinocchio, Lorenzini falls into the water and turns into a sea monster, which swims out to the ocean.
 In Geppetto, Pleasure Island's ringmaster (portrayed by Usher) is loosely based on the Coachman and operates the roller coaster that turns the boys into donkeys. After Geppetto follows the roller coaster that Pinocchio is in, the ringmaster orders his roustabouts to begin loading the boat.
 The Coachman appears in the 2002 Pinocchio film portrayed by Luis Molteni and voiced by Erik Bergmann in the English dub. He takes Pinocchio, Lucignolo, and the other boys to Fun Forever Land.
 In the live-action Italian film Pinocchio (2019), co-written, directed and co-produced by Matteo Garrone, the Coachman is portrayed by Nino Scardina while his English dub voice is provided by Giancarlo Magalli.
 In the 2022 stop-motion film adaptation of Pinocchio directed by Guillermo del Toro, the Podestà (voiced by Ron Perlman) is a high-ranking government official in early 20th century Fascist Italy, and is loosely based on the Coachman; he attempts to recruit Pinocchio as a soldier along with his own son, Candlewick before he is killed during an ally bombing run.

Bibliography
 Collodi, Le Avventure di Pinocchio 1883, Biblioteca Universale Rizzoli

References

Pinocchio characters
Fictional businesspeople
Fictional child abusers
Fictional kidnappers
Fictional Italian people in literature
Fictional slave owners
Literary characters introduced in 1883
Male characters in literature
Male literary villains